The New San Jose Builders Victorias were a professional women's volleyball club in the Philippine Superliga (PSL). It was owned by New San Jose Builders, Inc., a real estate firm, and participated in the 2016 PSL Invitational Cup. The team was composed of players from the Perpetual Help Altas women's volleyball team with two guest players from DLSU-D Patriots and the EAC Generals.

For the succeeding indoor conference, the team partnered with Sonia Trading, Inc. (distributor of Amy's Kitchen food products) and played as Amy's Kitchen-Perpetual.

Honors

Team

References

See also
 Amy's Kitchen-Perpetual

Women's volleyball teams in the Philippines
Philippine Super Liga
2016 establishments in the Philippines
Volleyball clubs established in 2016